Magusa orbifera is a moth of the family Noctuidae. It is found from southern Florida through the Florida Keys to the Caribbean. The species is commonly known as Orbed Narrow-wing, but this name may also be applied to Magusa divaricata, which was treated as a synonym until recently.

The wingspan is 34 mm. Adults are on wing year-round.

The larvae feed on Krugiodendron ferreum and Karwinskia humboldtiana.

Taxonomy
Magusa divaricata was previously treated as a synonym of Magusa orbifera, but was recently reinstated as a valid species.

References

Hadeninae
Moths of North America
Moths of the Caribbean
Moths of Cuba
Lepidoptera of Jamaica
Insects of Puerto Rico
Insects of the Dominican Republic
Moths described in 1857